

Georg Radziej (7 January 1895 – 13 May 1972) was a German general during World War II. He may have been a recipient of the Knight's Cross of the Iron Cross of Nazi Germany.

Awards and decorations

 Knight's Cross of the Iron Cross on 9 May 1945 as Generalleutnant and commander of the 169. Infanterie-Division

Notes

References

Citations

Bibliography

 
 

1895 births
1972 deaths
People from Pyskowice
People from the Province of Silesia
Lieutenant generals of the German Army (Wehrmacht)
German Army personnel of World War I
Prussian Army personnel
Recipients of the clasp to the Iron Cross, 1st class
Recipients of the Gold German Cross
Recipients of the Knight's Cross of the Iron Cross
Recipients of the Order of the Cross of Liberty, 1st Class
Reichswehr personnel
German Army generals of World War II